The Marble Schoolhouse is a Greek Revival style schoolhouse in Eastchester, New York that was built in 1835. The stone of its facade was quarried in nearby Tuckahoe, New York.  It was listed on the National Register of Historic Places in 2005.

The building was moved to its current location in 1869.

The schoolhouse features exhibits of local history and is open by appointment with the Eastchester Historical Society.

See also
National Register of Historic Places listings in southern Westchester County, New York

References

External links
Eastchester Historical Society - information
Information about the Eastchester Historical Society and the Marble Schoolhouse

Eastchester, New York
School buildings on the National Register of Historic Places in New York (state)
School buildings completed in 1835
Greek Revival architecture in New York (state)
One-room schoolhouses in New York (state)
Historical society museums in New York (state)
Museums in Westchester County, New York
National Register of Historic Places in Westchester County, New York
Relocated buildings and structures in New York (state)